Mireo d.d. is a company and brand that produces global automotive navigation systems for smartphones, personal navigation devices and in-car infotainment systems. They also provide fleet management and vehicle tracking services and produce detailed maps of Croatia, Bosnia and Herzegovina.
Mireo was founded in 2001 in Zagreb, Croatia and sells proprietary navigation products in over 70 countries.

Mireo's DON'T PANIC navigation software runs on Apple iOS, Google's Android and BlackBerry 10 smartphone/tablet operating systems and Microsoft Windows CE enabled devices and uses maps by TomTom and local providers.
Mireo's Genius Maps: GPS Navigation and Offline Maps runs on Apple iOS and Google's Android smartphone/tablet operating systems and uses maps by HERE/Navteq and local providers.
Both Genius Maps and DON'T PANIC support a broad selection of world languages for their user interfaces and voice instructions.

References 

Companies based in Zagreb
Companies established in 2001
2001 establishments in Croatia
Information technology companies of Croatia